Comfort is an unincorporated community in Jones County, in eastern North Carolina, United States.

References

Unincorporated communities in Jones County, North Carolina
Unincorporated communities in North Carolina